Porto Carras (Greek: Πόρτο Καρράς), known as Porto Carras Grand Resort, is one of northern Greece's largest and most famous hotels and holiday resorts. It is located on Sithonia, Chalkidiki peninsula in Macedonia, Greece. It is about 120 km away from Greece's second-biggest city, Thessaloniki.

Porto Carras was created by Yiannis Carras, a Greek businessman and ship-owner. Originally it was planned with the renowned architect Walter Gropius, but the construction works started posthumously in 1973. The project brought a revolution to Chalkidiki's tourism. Porto Carras Grand Resort includes two major hotels, the 5-star Meliton and 4-star Sithonia as well as the bungalow style hotels Marina Village and Kalyva Mare. There are also 45,000 olive trees; basketball, football, tennis, and golf sports areas as well as a vineyard covering an area of 475,000 m². Porto Carras is home to the biggest private marina in northern Greece, having berths for 315 boats. It also contains restaurants, spa, interior and beach bars and a cinema theater. In April 2020, Porto Carras changed ownership and became a member of Belterra Investments.

The resort of Porto Carras is near the traditional village of Neos Marmaras; a tourist destination, busy during the summer period, with many restaurants, cafeterias and tourist shops.

Held events
During June 2003, Porto Carras was the place of the Thessaloniki European Union Summit; organized under the Greek Presidency, during which the draft Constitution of the E.U. was presented for first time. The 25 leaders of European Union, along with Turkey's Prime Minister and the heads of NATO and E.U. took part in an official dinner, hosted by the then President of the Hellenic Republic.

There was also held the European Team Chess Championships 2011.

External links
 Porto Carras Grand Resort - official website

Hotels in Greece
Marinas in Greece
Buildings and structures in Central Macedonia
Chalkidiki
Greek brands
Hotels established in 1973
Hotel buildings completed in 1973
Walter Gropius buildings